Cecilia Seghizzi (5 September 1908 – 22 November 2019) was an Italian composer, painter and teacher.

Biography
Cecilia Seghizzi was the daughter of composer and choirmaster  (19 January 1873 – 5 January 1933), one of Italy's most popular composers. After coming back to Italy after being exiled to the refugee camp of Wagna in Austria during World War I, Cecilia began studying the violin with Alfredo Lucarini and graduated with honors from the Conservatory "G. Verdi" in Milan. In her thirties she alternated between concerts and teaching in middle school and  music school.

She began in the meantime to devote herself to composition, completing her studies with a diploma from the conservatory "Tartini" in Trieste under the guidance of Vito Levi. In her fifties she founded and managed the complex Gorizia polyphonic, with which she won first prize at the national polyphonic competition in Brescia. The recognition from this got her a series of concerts and recordings for major venues both at home and abroad. She lived the rest of her life in Gorizia, Friuli-Venezia Giulia.

Style

Her music catalog included more than 130 compositions, among which many are choral music. It is in choral music that she used sonorities and driving rhythms, humorous and light swings the most. In this her work is similar to that of Alfredo Casella, Paul Hindemith, and Giulio Viozzi. Her style, very conservative, is linked to neo-classicism, and has had no trace of the innovations introduced by avant-garde music since the 1930s.

Personal life
On 5 September 2018, she became a supercentenarian upon celebrating her 110th birthday. She died on 22 November 2019, at the age of 111.

Selected works
Sonata for Oboe and Piano (1963)
By night flute, soprano and piano (1979)
Concertino for horn and strings (1981)
Divertimento for violin and piano (1982)
Waltz for flute and piano (1984)

References

1908 births
2019 deaths
Italian composers
Italian supercentenarians
People from Gorizia
Women supercentenarians
Italian women painters
20th-century Italian women artists
Italian women composers
20th-century Italian composers